Richard D. Vigil is an American politician and businessman who served as a member of the New Mexico House of Representatives for the 70th district from 1999 to 2012.

Background 
Vigil is a native of Ribera, New Mexico. Elected to the New Mexico House of Representatives in 1998, he assumed office in 1999. Vigil served until 2012. In the 2012 election, Vigil was defeated in the Democratic primary by Tomás Salazar.

References 

Living people
Democratic Party members of the New Mexico House of Representatives
People from San Miguel County, New Mexico
Year of birth missing (living people)
21st-century American politicians